Nicholas Berliner is an American diplomat who is currently the Deputy Chief of Mission at the US embassy in Belgium.

References 

Year of birth missing (living people)
Living people
Ambassadors of the United States to Belgium